The Prinzregentenstraße (Prince-Regent Street) in Munich is one of four royal avenues and runs parallel to Maximilianstraße and begins at Prinz-Carl-Palais, in the northeastern part of the Old Town. The avenue was constructed from 1891 onwards as a prime address for the middle-class during the reign of Luitpold, Prince Regent of Bavaria and is named in his honour. The square in the eastern part of the street is named Prinzregentenplatz.

Architecture
In contrast to Ludwigstraße, the big boulevard of his father Ludwig I and to Maximilianstraße, the boulevard of his brother Maximilian II, Prinzregentenstraße was not planned as an administrative centre with a specially developed style; it was projected as a noble middle-class avenue. Thereby it reflects not only middle-class ideals, but was an expression of the good relation between the citizens, above all of the bourgeoisie and the educated classes, and the house of Wittelsbach. At the same time Prinzregentenstraße demonstrates the prosperity about 1900.

Many museums can be found along the avenue, such as the Bayerisches Nationalmuseum (Bavarian National Museum, by Gabriel von Seidl 1894-1900), the Schackgalerie (by Max Littmann, 1907) and the Villa Stuck (1898) of Franz von Stuck which is already situated on the eastern side of the Isar river. The avenue crosses the river and circles the Friedensengel (Angel of Peace), a monument commemorating the 25 years of peace following the Franco-Prussian War in 1871. In 1891 the steel bridge was built as part of the Prinzregentenstraße after a draft of the architect Friedrich von Thiersch, which was financed by the Prince Regent and named after him. It was decorated by four stone sculptures which symbolized Bavaria, Swabia, Franconia and the Palatinate.

In the winter the Prinzregentstadion on the eastern side serves for ice skating,  for the rest of the year the stadium is transformed into an open-air swimming pool. The Prinzregententheater (by Max Littmann, 1901), an important theatre of the city, is at Prinzregentenplatz further to the east. In the easternmost part of the Prinzregentenstraße the church St. Gabriel was built in 1925–1926 by Otho Orlando Kurz and Eduard Herbert.

Third Reich

Starting with the  Haus der Kunst ("House of Art"", 1933-1937 by Paul Ludwig Troost) the Prinzregentenstraße was altered by the Nazi Party, same as they did with the Brienner Straße and the Ludwigstraße to transform the royal avenues according to their ideas of a boulevard, which was always an expression of power and political significance for them.

The former Luftgaukommando South opposite to the National Museum was built 1937/38 during the Third Reich and designed by German Bestelmeyer. The three-storey central building (250 meters long) is set back from the street and today serves as Bavarian Ministry of Economy. In the east it is flanked by a five-story tower, to the west by a four-storey front building.

The tower-like, elongated bunker close to St. Gabriel also belongs to the Third Reich constructions in Munich. Today it serves as Kunstbunker Tumulka.

Adolf Hitler's private apartment in Munich was located at 16 Prinzregentenplatz. It was his official private address and, beginning in 1929, the address in which he lived with his niece, Geli Raubal, who later committed suicide. Today, Hitler's second-floor apartment houses the Munich Financing Office for the state of Bavaria and Hitler's room is currently used for storage and not open to the public.

References

See also
 Prinzregentenplatz (Munich U-Bahn)

Streets in Munich
Tourist attractions in Munich